Garnet is a name of Middle English origin, derived from the dark red gemstone, which was in turn named for the pomegranate that the garnet crystals resemble. The surname Garnett comes from an Old English occupational surname referring to a seller of hinges. It is both a surname and a given name.

The name came into occasional use along with other gem names during the late Victorian era. Garnet was among the top 1,000 names for girls in the United States between 1884 and 1944. It was most popular in 1911, when it was the 376th most popular given name for American girls. It was in occasional use for boys in the United States between 1882 and 1925. It was most popular in 1904, when it was 593rd most popular name for American boys. The name has not appeared among the top 1,000 names for boys or girls since 1944 in the United States.

People

Surname
 Eldon Garnet (born 1946), Canadian artist
 Henry Garnet (1555–1606), English Jesuit
 Henry Highland Garnet (1815–1882), African-American abolishionist
 John Roslyn Garnet (1906–1998), Australian biochemist and naturalist
 Sarah J. Garnet (1883–1911), African-American educator
 Thomas Garnet (1575–1608), English Jesuit priest

First name
 Garnet Ault (1905–1993), Canadian swimmer
 Garnet Bailey (1946–2001), Canadian ice hockey player
 Garnet Baltimore (1859–1946), African-American engineer
 Garnet Bloomfield (born 1929), Canadian politician
 Garnet Bougoure (1923–2008), Australian jockey
 Garnet Brown (1930–2010), Canadian businessman
 Garnet Campbell (1903–1971), former Australian rules footballer
Garnet H. Carroll (1902–1964), Australian theatre producer
 Garnet Clark (1917–1938), American jazz pianist
 Garnet Coleman (born 1961), American politician
 Garnet Coulter (1882–1975), Canadian politician
 Garnet Exelby (born 1981), Canadian ice hockey player
 Garnet Hathaway (1991) American ice hockey player 
 Garnet Hughes (1880–1937), Canadian military officer
 Garnet Jex (1895–1979), American artist and historian
 Garnet Kearney (1884–1971), Canadian doctor
 Garnet Lee (1887–1978), English cricketer
 Garnet Mackley (1883–1986), New Zealand businessman and politician
 Garnet Malley (1892–1961), Australia WWI flying ace
 Garnet Mimms (born 1933), American singer
 Garnet Richardson (1933-2016), former Canadian curler
 Garnet Rogers (born 1955), Canadian musician
 Garnet Walch (1843–1913), Australian writer
 Garnet Wolseley, 1st Viscount Wolseley (1833–1913), British Army officer

Notes

See also
Garnet (disambiguation)
Garnett (disambiguation)

English-language unisex given names
Given names derived from gemstones